Lou Wilson is an American actor, writer, and comedian. He is best known for his work as a writer and the on-air announcer for Jimmy Kimmel Live! and his roles on American Vandal, The King of Staten Island, and The Guest Book. He is also known for his work on actual play anthologies such as the web series Dimension 20 and the creator-owned podcast Worlds Beyond Number.

Early life and education 
Wilson was raised in Altadena, California and has lived in Los Angeles for the majority of his life. He attended Boston College and studied communications and Italian. While there, he became a member of the university's comedy troupe, My Mother's Fleabag. After his graduation in 2014, Wilson moved back to California and joined the Upright Citizens Brigade in Los Angeles.

Career 
In 2017, Wilson starred as Frank in The Guest Book and played Lucas Wiley on Netflix's American Vandal. Additionally, he acted alongside Pete Davidson in The King of Staten Island (2020), where he played the role of Richie. He began writing for Jimmy Kimmel Live! in 2020 and was promoted to on-air announcer in 2022, replacing Dicky Barett after he retired. 

Wilson is known within the tabletop role-playing game community as a primary cast member of Dimension 20, an actual play anthology web series which premiered in 2018; it was created by CollegeHumor for the streaming service Dropout. In 2022, he was a cast member of the actual play anthology Exandria Unlimited: Calamity, a spin-off of the web series Critical Role. In January 2023, it was announced that Wilson, alongside Erika Ishii, Aabria Iyengar, and Brennan Lee Mulligan, would star in the creator-owned actual play podcast Worlds Beyond Number; the show premiered in March 2023.

Wilson is also an improvisational comedian. He is currently a member of the improv troupe Yeti, which includes fellow Dimension 20 cast members Zac Oyama and Ally Beardsley and performs at the Upright Citizens Brigade in Los Angeles.

Filmography

Film

Television

Web series

References 

1991 births
Living people
21st-century American actors
American television actors
American male comedians
American male television writers
African-American male comedians